Pipizella viduata is a species of Hoverfly, from the family Syrphidae, in the order Diptera.

Description
External images
For terms see Morphology of Diptera Wing length 3 ·7 5-5 ·25 mm Genitalia figured by Van Veen (refs), small species, basitarsi dusky or dark brown. 
See references for determination.

Distribution
Palearctic Fennoscandia South to Iberia and the Mediterranean basin. Ireland East Europe into European Russia and the Caucasus then to Siberia.

Biology
Woodland, scrub, dune grassland, heathland and unimproved pasture, grassy clearings in woodland Flowers visited include umbellifers, Euphorbia, Galium, Potentilla erecta.  Flies April to October

References

Diptera of Europe
Pipizinae
Flies described in 1758
Taxa named by Carl Linnaeus